Frank Schneider may refer to:

Frank Schneider (musicologist) (born 1942), German musicologist
Frank Schneider (spy), Luxembourger spy

See also
 Frank Snyder, American baseball player and coach